Athletics is one of the sports at the quadrennial Pan Arab Games competition. Athletics competitions have been held at every one of the eleven editions of the Pan Arab Games, which was inaugurated in 1953. Many of the region's top athletes have competed in the athletics at the Pan Arab Games, such as Saïd Aouita, Hassiba Boulmerka and Ghada Shouaa. Women's events were added to the programme at the 1985 Pan Arab Games and the 1984 Olympic champion Nawal El Moutawakel went on to win gold medals in four separate events.

Editions

See also
International Athletics Championships and Games
Arab Athletics Championships

References

External links
Past champions from GBR Athletics

 
Sports at the Pan Arab Games
Pan Arab Games
Pan Arab Games
Pan Arab Games